Allium erdelii is a plant species found in Israel, Palestine Lebanon, Syria, Iraq, Egypt, Libya and Jordan. It is a bulb-forming perennial with a small umbel of creamy-white flowers.

References

erdelii
Onions
Flora of Iraq
Flora of Lebanon and Syria
Flora of Egypt
Flora of Libya
Flora of Palestine (region)
Plants described in 1843